Sir Peter Alexander Ustinov  (born Peter Alexander Freiherr von Ustinov ; 16 April 192128 March 2004) was a British actor, filmmaker and writer. An internationally known raconteur, he was a fixture on television talk shows and lecture circuits for much of his career. An intellectual and diplomat, he held various academic posts and served as a goodwill ambassador for UNICEF and president of the World Federalist Movement.

Ustinov was the winner of numerous awards during his life, including two Academy Awards for Best Supporting Actor, Emmy Awards, Golden Globes, and BAFTA Awards for acting, and a Grammy Award for best recording for children, as well as the recipient of governmental honours from, amongst others, the United Kingdom, France, and Germany. He also displayed a unique cultural versatility which frequently earned him the accolade of a Renaissance man. Miklós Rózsa, composer of the music for Quo Vadis and of numerous concert works, dedicated his String Quartet No. 1, Op. 22 (1950) to Ustinov.

In 2003, Durham University changed the name of its Graduate Society to Ustinov College in honour of the significant contributions Ustinov had made as chancellor of the university from 1992 until his death.

Early life
Peter Alexander Freiherr von Ustinov was born at 45 Belsize Park, London, England. His father, Jona Freiherr von Ustinov, was of Russian, German, Polish, Ethiopian and Jewish descent. Ustinov's paternal grandfather was Baron Plato von Ustinov, a Russian noble, and his grandmother was Magdalena Hall, of mixed German-Ethiopian-Jewish origin.  Ustinov's great-grandfather Moritz Hall, a Jewish refugee from Kraków and later a Christian convert and colleague  of Swiss and German missionaries in Ethiopia, married into a German-Ethiopian family.
Ustinov's paternal great-great-grandparents (through Magdalena's mother) were the German painter Eduard Zander and the Ethiopian aristocrat Court-Lady Isette-Werq of Gondar.

Ustinov's mother, Nadezhda Leontievna Benois, known as Nadia, was a painter and ballet designer of French, German, Italian, and Russian descent. Her father, Leon Benois, was an Imperial Russian architect and owner of Leonardo da Vinci's painting Benois Madonna. Leon's brother Alexandre Benois was a stage designer who worked with Stravinsky and Diaghilev. Their paternal ancestor Jules-César Benois was a chef who had left France for St. Petersburg during the French Revolution and became a chef to Emperor Paul I of Russia.

Jona (or Iona) worked as a press officer at the German Embassy in London in the 1930s and was a reporter for a German news agency. In 1935, two years after Adolf Hitler came to power in Germany, Jona von Ustinov began working for the British intelligence service MI5 and became a British subject, thus avoiding internment during the war. The statutory notice of his application for citizenship was published in a Welsh newspaper so as not to alert the Germans. He was the controller of Wolfgang Gans zu Putlitz, an MI5 spy in the German embassy in London, who furnished information on Hitler's intentions before the Second World War. (Peter Wright mentions in his book Spycatcher that Jona was possibly the spy known as U35; Ustinov says in his autobiography that his father hosted secret meetings of senior British and German officials at their London home).

Ustinov was educated at Westminster School and had a difficult childhood because of his parents' constant fighting. While at school, Ustinov considered anglicising his name to "Peter Austin", but was counselled against it by a fellow pupil who said that he should "Drop the 'von' but keep the 'Ustinov. In his late teens he trained as an actor at the London Theatre Studio. While there, on 18 July 1938 he made his first appearance on the stage at the Barn Theatre, Shere, playing Waffles in Chekhov’s The Wood Demon, and his London stage début later that year at the Players' Theatre, becoming quickly established. He later wrote, "I was not irresistibly drawn to the drama. It was an escape road from the dismal rat race of school".

Career highlights

In 1939, he appeared in White Cargo at the Aylesbury Rep, where he performed in a different accent every night. Ustinov served as a private in the British Army during the Second World War, including time spent as batman to David Niven while writing the Niven film The Way Ahead. The difference in their ranksNiven was a lieutenant-colonel and Ustinov a privatemade their regular association militarily impossible; to solve the problem, Ustinov was appointed as Niven's batman. He also appeared in propaganda films, debuting in One of Our Aircraft Is Missing (1942), in which he was required to deliver lines in English, Latin, and Dutch. In 1944, under the auspices of Entertainments National Service Association, he presented and performed the role of Sir Anthony Absolute, in Sheridan's The Rivals, with Dame Edith Evans, at the theatre in  Larkhill Camp, Wiltshire, England.

After the war, he began writing; his first major success was with the play The Love of Four Colonels (1951). He starred with Humphrey Bogart and Aldo Ray in We're No Angels (1955). His career as a dramatist continued, his best-known play being Romanoff and Juliet (1956). His film roles include Roman emperor Nero in Quo Vadis (1951), Lentulus Batiatus in Spartacus (1960), Captain Blackbeard in the Disney film Blackbeard’s Ghost (1968), and an old man surviving a totalitarian future in Logan's Run (1976). Ustinov voiced the anthropomorphic lions Prince John and King Richard in the 1973 Disney animated film Robin Hood. He also worked on several films as writer and occasionally director, including The Way Ahead (1944), School for Secrets (1946), Hot Millions (1968), and Memed, My Hawk (1984).

In half a dozen films, he played Agatha Christie's detective Hercule Poirot, first in Death on the Nile (1978) and then in 1982's Evil Under the Sun, 1985's Thirteen at Dinner (TV movie), 1986's Dead Man's Folly (TV movie), 1986's Murder in Three Acts (TV movie), and 1988's Appointment with Death.

Ustinov won Academy Awards for Best Supporting Actor for his roles in Spartacus (1960) and Topkapi (1964). He also won a Golden Globe award for Best Supporting Actor for the film Quo Vadis (he set the Oscar and Globe statuettes up on his desk as if playing doubles tennis; the game was a love of his life, as was ocean yachting). Ustinov was also the winner of three Emmys and one Grammy and was nominated for two Tony Awards.

Between 1952 and 1955, he starred with Peter Jones in the BBC radio comedy In All Directions. The series featured Ustinov and Jones as themselves in a London car journey perpetually searching for Copthorne Avenue. The comedy derived from the characters they met, whom they often also portrayed. The show was unusual for the time, as it was improvised rather than scripted. Ustinov and Jones improvised on a tape, which was difficult, and then edited for broadcast by Frank Muir and Denis Norden, who also sometimes took part.

During the 1960s, with the encouragement of Sir Georg Solti, Ustinov directed several operas, including Puccini's Gianni Schicchi, Ravel's L'heure espagnole, Schoenberg's Erwartung, and Mozart's The Magic Flute. Further demonstrating his great talent and versatility in the theatre, Ustinov later undertook set and costume design for Don Giovanni. In 1962 he adapted Louis O. Coxe and Robert H. Chapman's critically successful Broadway play Billy Budd into a film; penning the screenplay, producing, directing, and starring as Captain Fairfax.

In 1968, he was elected the first rector of the University of Dundee and served two consecutive three-year terms.

His autobiography, Dear Me (1977), was well received and had him describe his life (ostensibly his childhood) while being interrogated by his own ego, with forays into philosophy, theatre, fame, and self-realisation. From 1969 until his death, his acting and writing took second place to his work on behalf of UNICEF, for which he was a goodwill ambassador and fundraiser. In this role, he visited some of the neediest children and made use of his ability to make people laugh, including many of the world's most disadvantaged children. "Sir Peter could make anyone laugh", UNICEF Executive Director Carol Bellamy is quoted as saying. On 31 October 1984, Ustinov was due to interview Prime Minister of India Indira Gandhi for Irish television. She was assassinated on her way to the meeting.

Ustinov also served as president of the World Federalist Movement from 1991 until his death. He once said, "World government is not only possible, it is inevitable, and when it comes, it will appeal to patriotism in its truest, in its only sense, the patriotism of men who love their national heritages so deeply that they wish to preserve them in safety for the common good".

He was a frequent guest of Jack Paar's Tonight Show in the early 1960s and was a guest on the "upside down" episode of the American talk show Late Night, during which the camera, mounted on a slowly revolving wheel, gradually rotated the picture 360° during the course of an hour; Ustinov appeared midway through and was photographed upside down in close-up as he spoke, while his host appeared only in long shots. Towards the end of Ustinov's life, he undertook some one-man stage shows in which he let loose his raconteur streak; he told the story of his life, including some moments of tension with the society into which he was born. For example, he took a test as a child, asking him to name a Russian composer; he wrote Rimsky-Korsakov, but was marked down. He was then told the correct answer, Tchaikovsky, since he had been studying him in class and was told to stop showing off.

He was the subject of This Is Your Life on two occasions, in November 1977 when he was surprised by Eamonn Andrews at Pinewood Studios on the set of Death on the Nile and a week before, he was surprised at a book signing at book printers Butler and Tanner in Frome, Somerset. This footage was not used, as Ustinov flatly refused to take part and swore at Andrews. His wife persuaded him to change his mind. He was surprised again in December 1994, when Michael Aspel approached him at the United Nations headquarters in Geneva.

A car enthusiast since the age of four, he owned a succession of interesting machines ranging from a Fiat Topolino, several Lancias, a Hispano-Suiza, a preselector gearbox Delage, and a special-bodied Jowett Jupiter. He made records like Phoney Folklore that included the song of the Russian peasant "whose tractor had betrayed him" and his "Grand Prix of Gibraltar" was a vehicle for his creative wit and ability at car-engine sound effects and voices.

He spoke English, French, Spanish, Italian, German, and Russian fluently, as well as some Turkish and modern Greek. He was proficient in accents and dialects in all his languages. Ustinov provided his own German and French dubbing for some of his roles, both of them for Lorenzo's Oil. As Hercule Poirot, he provided his own voice for the French versions of Thirteen at Dinner, Dead Man's Folly, Murder in Three Acts, Appointment with Death, and Evil under the Sun, but unlike Jane Birkin, who had dubbed herself in French for this film and Death on the Nile, Ustinov did not provide his voice for the latter (his French voice being provided by Roger Carel, who had already dubbed him in Spartacus and other films). He dubbed himself in German as Poirot only in Evil under the Sun (his other Poirot roles being undertaken by three actors). However, he provided only his English and German voices for Disney's Robin Hood and NBC's Alice in Wonderland.

In the 1960s, he became a Swiss resident. He was knighted in 1990 and was appointed chancellor of Durham University in 1992, having previously been elected as the first rector of the University of Dundee in 1968 (a role in which he moved from being merely a figurehead to taking on a political role, negotiating with student protesters). Ustinov was re-elected to the post for a second three-year term in 1971, narrowly beating Michael Parkinson after a disputed recount. He received an honorary doctorate from the Vrije Universiteit Brussel.

Ustinov was a frequent defender of the Chinese government, stating in an address to Durham University in 2000, "People are annoyed with the Chinese for not respecting more human rights. But with a population that size it's very difficult to have the same attitude to human rights." In 2003, Durham's postgraduate college (previously known as the Graduate Society) was renamed Ustinov College. Ustinov went to Berlin on a UNICEF mission in 2002 to visit the circle of United Buddy Bears that promote a more peaceful world between nations, cultures, and religions for the first time. He was determined to ensure that Iraq would also be represented in this circle of about 140 countries. Ustinov also presented and narrated the official video review of the 1987 Formula One season and narrated the documentary series Wings of the Red Star. In 1988, he hosted a live television broadcast entitled The Secret Identity of Jack the Ripper. Ustinov gave his name to the Foundation of the International Academy of Television Arts and Sciences for their Sir Peter Ustinov Television Scriptwriting Award, given annually to a young television screenwriter.

Personal life

Ustinov was married three times—first to Isolde Denham (1920–1987), daughter of Reginald Denham and Moyna Macgill. The marriage lasted from 1940 to their divorce in 1950, and they had one child, daughter Tamara Ustinov. Isolde was the half-sister of Angela Lansbury, who appeared with Ustinov in Death on the Nile. His second marriage was to Suzanne Cloutier, which lasted from 1954 to their divorce in 1971. They had three children: two daughters, Pavla Ustinov and Andrea Ustinov, and a son, Igor Ustinov (de). His third marriage was to Helene du Lau d'Allemans, which lasted from 1972 to his death in 2004.

Ustinov was a secular humanist. He was listed as a distinguished supporter of the British Humanist Association, and had once served on their advisory council.

Ustinov suffered from diabetes and a weakened heart in his last years.

Death
Ustinov died on 28 March 2004 of heart failure in a clinic in Genolier, near his home in Bursins, Switzerland, aged 82. He had suffered from diabetes and heart disease. UNICEF Executive Director Carol Bellamy spoke at his funeral, representing United Nations Secretary-General Kofi Annan.

Globalism
Ustinov was the president of the World Federalist Movement (WFM) from 1991 to 2004, the time of his death. WFM is a global nongovernmental organization that promotes the concept of global democratic institutions. WFM lobbies those in powerful positions to establish a unified human government based on democracy and civil society. Under its plan, the United Nations and other world agencies would become the institutions of a World Federation. The UN would be the federal government and nation states would become similar to provinces.

Until his death, Ustinov was a member of English PEN, part of the PEN International network that campaigns for freedom of expression.

Filmography
Films

Television
 What's My Line? (1957—1966) – gameshow, 9 episodes
 I've Got a Secret (1960) – gameshow, 1 episode
 Barefoot in Athens (1966) – TV film, as Socrates
 Klapzubova jedenáctka (1968) – TV serial, episode 12: "Muži z Ria", as television commentator
 Parkinson (1971—1972) – talk show, 3 episodes
 The Muppet Show (1976) – 1 episode, as himself
  (1976) – TV film, as owner of Billy's artstore
 Jesus of Nazareth (1977) – miniseries, as Herod the Great
 Doctor Snuggles (1979) – 13 episodes, as Doctor Snuggles
 Einstein's Universe (1979) – documentary film, as himself
 Nuclear Nightmares (1979) – documentary film, as himself
 Omni: The New Frontier (1981)
 Overheard (1984) – TV film, as Comrade Kuruk
 Thirteen at Dinner (1985) – TV film, as Hercule Poirot
 Dead Man's Folly (1986) – TV film, as Hercule Poirot
 Murder in Three Acts (1986) – TV film, as Hercule Poirot
 Peter Ustinov's Russia (1986) – documentary miniseries, as himself
 Le défi mondial (1986)
 An Audience with Peter Ustinov (1988)
 The Secret Identity of Jack the Ripper (1988) – documentary
 Around the World in 80 Days (1989) – miniseries, as Detective Wilbur Fix
 Peter Ustinov on the Orient Express (1991)
 Wings of the Red Star (1993) – documentary series, 13 episodes, as narrator
Celebrating Haydn with Peter Ustinov (1994) – documentary
 The Old Curiosity Shop (1995) – TV film, as Grandfather
 Paths of the Gods (1995) – documentary series, 8 episodes, as himself
Sir Peter Ustinov's Mendelssohn (1997) – documentary
 Alice in Wonderland (1999) – TV film, as Walrus
 Animal Farm (1999) – TV film, as Old Major (voice)
 Victoria & Albert  (2001) – TV serial, as King William IV
 Winter Solstice - Hughie McLellan

Nonfiction
 Apropos: portrait painting 
 Dear Me
 Generation at Jeopardy: Children in Central and Eastern Europe and the Former Soviet Union 
(introduction by Peter Ustinov) (UNICEF)  

 Klop and the Ustinov Family (with Nadia Benois Ustinov) 1973 
 My Russia

 Niven's Hollywood (introduction by Peter Ustinov)

 Quotable Ustinov
 Still at Large
 Ustinov at Eighty
 Ustinov at Large
 Ustinov in Russia
 Ustinov Still at Large
 Ustinov's diplomats 
 We Were Only Human.

Novels, novellas, short stories and plays

 Abelard and Heloise
 Add a Dash of Pity and Other Short Stories
 Beethoven's Tenth
 Blow Your Own Trumpet (1943 play)
 Brewer's Theatre (with Isaacs, et al.)
 The Comedy Collection
 Disinformer: Two Novellas
 Frontiers of the Sea
 God and the State Railways
 Halfway Up the Tree
 The Indifferent Shepherd
 James Thurber with Thurber
 Krumnagel
 The Laughter Omnibus
 Life is an Operetta: And Other Short Stories
 The Loser
 The Love of Four Colonels
 The Methuen Book of Theatre Verse (with Jonathan and Moira Field)
 Monsieur Rene
 The Moment of Truth
 No Sign of the Dove (play, unsuccessful, ran for only a week at the Savoy Theatre c. 1952)
 The Old Man and Mr. Smith: A Fable
 Photo Finish
 Romanoff and Juliet
 The 13 Clocks with James Thurber
 The Unicorn in the Garden and Other Fables for Our Time (with James Thurber)
 The Unknown Soldier and His Wife

Discography
 Grand Prix of Gibraltar (1960) (spoken word comedy)
 The Creatures of Prometheus (Ludwig van Beethoven), a musical narration – RCA Red Seal 74321 82163 2 (2001)
 Der Burger als Edelmann (After Moliere, adapted by Ustinov, incidental music by Richard Strauss), Koch Classics 3-6578-2 (1998)

Awards

Academy Award
 1952 nominated: Best Supporting Actor (Quo Vadis)
 1961 won: Best Supporting Actor (Spartacus)
 1965 won: Best Supporting Actor (Topkapi)
 1969 nominated: Best Original Screenplay (Hot Millions, with Ira Wallach)

BAFTA Award
 1962 nominated: Best British Screenplay (Billy Budd)
 1978 nominated: Best Actor in a Leading Role (Death on the Nile)
 1992 won: Britannia Award for Lifetime Achievement
 1995 nominated: Best Light Entertainment Performance (An Evening with Sir Peter Ustinov)

Berlin International Film Festival
 1961 nominated: Golden Bear (Romanoff and Juliet)
 1972 won: Silver Bear for an outstanding artistic contribution (Hammersmith Is Out)
 1972 nominated: Golden Bear (Hammersmith Is Out)

Emmy Award
 1958 won: Best Single Performance by a Leading or Supporting Actor (Omnibus: The Life of Samuel Johnson)
 1967 won: Outstanding Single Performance by an Actor in a Leading Role (Barefoot in Athens)
 1970 won: Outstanding Single Performance by an Actor in a Leading Role (A Storm in Summer)
 1982 nominated: Outstanding Individual Achievement in Informational Programming (Omni: The New Frontier)
 1985 nominated: Outstanding Classical Program in the Performing Arts (The Well-Tempered Bach with Peter Ustinov)

Golden Globe Award
 1952 won: Best Supporting Actor in a Motion Picture (Quo Vadis)
 1961 nominated: Best Supporting Actor in a Motion Picture (Spartacus)
 1965 nominated: Best Actor in a Motion Picture – Musical or Comedy (Topkapi)

Grammy Award
 1960 won: Best Recording for Children (Prokofiev: Peter and the Wolf) with the Philharmonia Orchestra directed by Herbert von Karajan
 1974 nominated: Best Recording for Children (The Little Prince)
 1978 nominated: Best Recording for Children (Russell Hoban, The Mouse and His Child)
 1981 nominated: Best Spoken Word Album (A Curb in the Sky)

Tony Award
 1958 nominated: Best Play (Romanoff and Juliet)
 1958 nominated: Best Actor in a Play (Romanoff and Juliet)

Evening Standard British Film Award
 1980 won Best Actor (Death on the Nile)

Lifework
 1992: Britannia Award
 1993: London Critics' Award
 1994: Bambi
 1997: German Video Prize of the DIVA Award
 1998: Bavarian Television Award
 2001: Golden Camera (Goldene Kamera, Berlin)
 2002: Planetary Consciousness Award of the Club of Budapest
 2004: Bavarian Film Award (Bayerischer Filmpreis)
 2004: Rose d'Or Charity Award with UNICEF (posthumously)

Other
 1974: Golden Camera Award for Best Actor for the Exchange of Notes
 1978: Prix de la Butte for Oh my goodness! Messy memoirs
 1981: Karl Valentin Order (Munich)
 1987: Golden Rascal (Goldenes Schlitzohr)

State honours and awards
 1957: Benjamin Franklin Medal of the Royal Society of Arts (London)
 1974: Order of the Smile (Poland)
 1975: Commander of the Order of the British Empire (CBE) (United Kingdom)
 1978: UNICEF International Prize for outstanding services
 1985: Commander of the Ordre des Arts et des Lettres (France)
 1986: Istiqlal Order (Hashemite Kingdom of Jordan)
 1987: Order of the Yugoslav Flag
 1987: Elected to the Académie des Beaux-Arts
 1990: Gold Medal of the City of Athens
 1990: Medal of the Hellenic Red Cross
 1990: Knight Bachelor (United Kingdom)
 1991: Medal of Charles University in Prague
 1994: Knight of the National Order of the Southern Cross (Brazil)
 1994: German Culture Prize (Deutscher Kulturpreis)
 1995: International UNICEF Prize for Outstanding Services
 1998: Order of Merit of the Federal Republic of Germany (Bundesverdienstkreuz)
 2001: Austrian Cross of Honour for Science and Art, 1st class
 2004: Hanseatic Bremen Prize for International Understanding (Bremer Hansepreis für Völkerverständigung)

Honorary degrees
Ustinov received many honorary degrees for his work.

References

External links

 
 
 
 
 Obituary (UNICEF) 
 Obituary (BBC)
 "In All Directions"
 Peter Ustinov  interviewed by Mike Wallace on The Mike Wallace Interview (29 March 1958)
 Appearance on Desert Island Discs 19 November 1977
 Interview with Sir Peter Ustinov by Bruce Duffie, 22 May 1992 (Operatic directing and classical music)
 Peter Ustinov at the German Dubbing Card Index
 
 Video by the University of Dundee about Ustinov's time as its Rector

 
1921 births
2004 deaths
Actors awarded knighthoods
Alumni of the London Theatre Studio
Audiobook narrators
Assassination of Indira Gandhi
Benois family
Best Supporting Actor Academy Award winners
Best Supporting Actor Golden Globe (film) winners
British Army personnel of World War II
Chancellors of Durham University
Commanders of the Order of the British Empire
Commandeurs of the Ordre des Arts et des Lettres
Commanders Crosses of the Order of Merit of the Federal Republic of Germany
People with diabetes
English autobiographers
English dramatists and playwrights
English expatriates in Switzerland
English film directors
English humorists
English humanists
English male dramatists and playwrights
English male film actors
English male television actors
English male voice actors
English people of Ethiopian descent
English people of French descent
English people of German descent
English people of Israeli descent
English people of Italian descent
English people of Polish-Jewish descent
English people of Russian descent
English people of Swiss descent
English male screenwriters
English-language film directors
Grammy Award winners
Knights Bachelor
Male actors from London
Music hall performers
Outstanding Performance by a Lead Actor in a Miniseries or Movie Primetime Emmy Award winners
Parlophone artists
People educated at Gibbs School
People educated at Westminster School, London
People from Swiss Cottage
Recipients of the Order of Independence (Jordan)
Rectors of the University of Dundee
Royal Sussex Regiment soldiers
UNICEF Goodwill Ambassadors
World federalist activists
20th-century English novelists
Ustinov family
20th-century English screenwriters
Military personnel from London